Ahu A Umi Heiau means "shrine at the temple of Umi" in the Hawaiian Language.
It is also spelled "ahu-a-Umi", or known as Ahua A Umi Heiau, which would mean "mound of Umi".
It was built for ʻUmi-a-Liloa, often called Umi, who ruled the island of Hawaii early in the 16th century. He moved the seat of government here from the Waipio Valley.
The seat of power generally remained in the Kona District until the plantation days hundreds of years later.
Ahu A Umi Heiau was also the place where the great chief Keawenuiaumi (the son of
Umi) hid to escape death from a strong alii, Kalepuni, who attempted to
take over Keawe's rule.
The site was an enclosure surrounded by a number of stone cairns, up to four meters high and seven meters in diameter.

It is unusual to be built so far inland, on the high and dry plateau between Mauna Loa and Hualālai.
In the 19th century the site was built into a corral, but parts remain intact.
The Judd Trail was begun in 1849 to create a
direct route between Kailua and Hilo near the site, but trail completion was abandoned
after the Mauna Loa eruption of 1859 crossed the route.
A number of trails with traditional names mentioning King Umi's probably existed in that time. Some of these have been proposed to be restored into a Mauna Loa trail system.

The site is on the state register of historic places as site number 10-29-3810.
It was added to the National Register of Historic Places on August 13, 1974, as site number 74000343.
It is located in the upper elevations of the ahupuaa (traditional land division) called Keauhou 2.
Modern research proposes that the complex includes an astronomical direction register.

References

Heiau
Archaeological sites in Hawaii
Hawaiian architecture
Properties of religious function on the National Register of Historic Places in Hawaii
Hawaii (island)
Religious buildings and structures in Hawaii County, Hawaii
National Register of Historic Places in Hawaii County, Hawaii